El Cajon (Spanish: El Cajón, meaning "the box") is a city in San Diego County, California, United States,  east of downtown San Diego. The city takes its name from Rancho El Cajón, which was in turn named for the box-like shape of the valley that surrounds the city, which is also the origin of the city's common nickname of "the Box".

Name

El Cajón, Spanish for "the box", was first recorded on September 10, 1821, as an alternative name for sitio rancho Santa Mónica to describe the "boxed-in" nature of the valley in which it sat. The name appeared on maps in 1873 and 1875, shortened to "Cajon", until the modern town developed, in which the post office was named "El Cajon".

In 1905, the name was once again expanded to "El Cajon" under the insistence of California banker and historian Zoeth Skinner Eldredge.

History
During Spanish rule (1769–1821), the government encouraged settlement of territory now known as California by the establishment of large land grants called ranchos, from which the English word "ranch" is derived. Land grants were made to the Roman Catholic Church, which set up numerous missions throughout the region. In the early 19th century, mission padres' search for pastureland led them to the El Cajon Valley. Surrounding foothills served as a barrier to straying cattle and a watershed to gather the sparse rainfall. For years, the pasturelands of El Cajon supported the cattle herds of the mission and its native Indian converts.

Titles to plots of land were not granted to individuals until the Mexican era (1821–1846). The original intent of the 1834 secularization legislation was to have church property divided among the former mission Indians, but most of the grants were actually made to rich "Californios" of Spanish background who had long been casting envious eyes on the vast holdings of the Roman Catholic missions. In 1845, California Governor Pio Pico confiscated the lands of Mission San Diego de Alcala. He granted 11 square leagues (about ) of the El Cajon Valley to Dona Maria Antonio Estudillo, daughter of José Antonio Estudillo, alcalde of San Diego, to repay a $500 government obligation. The grant was originally called Rancho Santa Monica and encompassed present-day El Cajon, Bostonia, Santee, Lakeside, Flinn Springs, and the eastern part of La Mesa. It also contained the  Rancho Cañada de los Coches grant. Maria Estudillo was the wife of Don Miguel Pedrorena (1808–1850), a native of Madrid, Spain, who had come to California from Peru in 1838 to operate a trading business.

With the cession of California to the United States following the Mexican–American War, the 1848 Treaty of Guadalupe Hidalgo provided that the land grants would be honored. As required by the Land Act of 1851, a claim for Rancho El Cajon was filed by Thomas W. Sutherland, guardian of Pedrorena's heirs (his son, Miguel, and his three daughters, Victoria, Ysabel, and Elenain) with the Public Land Commission in 1852, confirmed by the U.S. Supreme Court, and the grant was patented in 1876. In 1868, Los Angeles land developer Isaac Lankershim bought the bulk of the Pedrorena's Rancho El Cajon holdings and employed Major Levi Chase, a former Union Army officer, as his agent. Chase received from Lankershim  known as the Chase Ranch. Lankershim hired Amaziah Lord Knox (1833–1918), a New Englander whom he had met in San Francisco, to manage Rancho El Cajon. In 1876, Knox established a hotel there to serve the growing number of people traveling between San Diego and Julian, where gold had been discovered in 1869. Room and board for a guest and horse cost $1 a night. The area became known as Knox's Corners and was later renamed. By 1878 there were 25 families living in the valley and a portion of the hotel lobby became the valley post office with Knox as the first postmaster.

El Cajon was incorporated as a city in 1912. For the first half of the 20th century, El Cajon was known for its grape, citrus, and tomato agriculture.

In the 1960s and 1970s, Frontier Town, Big Oak Ranch,  was a tourist attraction, featuring a typical frontier-town theme park and a periodic simulated shootout. The park closed around 1980 and is being used for residential housing.

Cajon Speedway was a  that operated from 1961 to 2005, which was founded by Earle Brucker Jr. of the El Cajon Stock Car Racing Association. One of his sons, Steve Brucker, later took over ownership of the track. Though closing after the death of Steve Brucker, it is a historic museum featuring the original entrance sign with the slogan "The fastest 3/8-mile paved oval in the West."

Geography
It is bordered by San Diego and La Mesa on the west, Spring Valley on the south, Santee on the north, and unincorporated San Diego County on the east. It includes the neighborhoods of Fletcher Hills, Bostonia, and Rancho San Diego.

Climate
Under the Köppen climate classification, El Cajon straddles areas of Mediterranean climate (Csa) and semiarid climate (BSh). As a result, it is often described as "arid Mediterranean" and "semiarid steppe". Like most inland areas in Southern California, the climate varies dramatically within a short distance, known as microclimate. El Cajon's climate has greater extremes compared to coastal San Diego. The farther east from the coast, the more arid the climate gets, until one reaches the mountains, where precipitation increases due to orographic uplift.

El Cajon's climate is warm during summer with mean temperatures averaging  or higher and cool during winter with mean temperatures averaging  or higher.

Temperature variations between night and day tend to be moderate with an average difference of  during the summer, and an average difference of  during the winter.

Rainfall is fairly evenly distributed throughout the winter, but rare in summer.

A rare snowfall in November 1992 totaled .  of snow covered the ground in January 1882.

Demographics

2010

The 2010 United States Census reported that El Cajon had a population of 99,478. The racial makeup of El Cajon was 43,746 (41.6%) White, 6,306 (6.3%) African American, 835 (0.8%) Native American, 3,561 (3.6%) Asian (1.7% Filipino, 0.5% Chinese, 0.4% Vietnamese, 0.2% Japanese, 0.1% Indian, 0.1% Korean, 0.6% other), 495 (0.5%) Pacific Islander, 26,498 (26.6%) from other races, and 6,832 (6.9%) from two or more races. Hispanics or Latinos of any race were 31,542 persons (30.4%).

About one-third of El Cajon residents are foreign-born. In particular, the city has a large Iraqi immigrant population, consisting of both Arabs and Chaldean Catholics; both groups are among the largest such communities in the country.
According to the U.S. Census Bureau 2008-2010 Estimate, 7,537 residents self identify as Arabs (7.6%; mainly Iraqi), and 6,409 (6.4%) are Chaldean Catholic Assyrians. In 2017, a spokesperson for the city of El Cajon estimated that 15,000 to 20,000 Chaldo-Assyrians live in the city.

In 2010, El Cajon had the highest poverty rate in San Diego County among adults, at 29.7%, and children, at 36.5%.

2000
As of the census of 2000,  94,869 people, 34,199 households, and 23,152 families were residing in the city. The racial makeup of the city was 42.9% White, 5.4% African American, 1.0% Native American, 2.8% Asian, 0.4% Pacific Islander, 24.1% from other races], and 6.0% from two or more races. Hispanics or Latinos of any race were 29.2% of the population.

Of the 34,199 households, 37.0% had children under  18 living with them, 46.0% were married couples living together, 16.0% had a female householder with no husband present, and 32.3% were not families. About 24.1% of all households were made up of individuals, and 8.5% had someone living alone who was 65  or older. The average household size was 2.70, and the average family size was 3.21.

In the city, the age distribution was 27.9% under 18, 11.2% from 18 to 24, 31.3% from 25 to 44, 18.3% from 45 to 64, and 11.3% who were 65 or older. The median age was 32 years. For every 100 females, there were 95.2 males. For every 100 females 18 and over, there were 91.4 males.

The median income for a household in the city was $35,566, and for a family was $40,045. Males had a median income of $32,498 versus $25,320 for females. The per capita income for the city was $16,698.  About 13.5% of families and 16.7% of the population were below the poverty line, including 23.1% of those under age 18 and 9.0% of those age 65 or over.

Household income
According to estimates by the San Diego Association of Governments, the median household income of El Cajon in 2005 was $47,885 (not adjusted for inflation). When adjusted for inflation (1999 dollars; comparable to Census data above), the median household income was $38,884.

Ethnic groups
, it had an estimated 40,000 Iraqi Americans. Included are members of different religious and ethnic groups originating from Iraq. The Iran-Iraq War prompted the first immigration, and it continued due to the Persian Gulf War and then the U.S. Invasion of Iraq and the resulting conflict.

Government
Until 2012, El Cajon was a general law city operating under a council-manager system. In June 2012, the voters adopted a city charter, changing its status to chartered city. El Cajon is governed by a five-member city council, on which the mayor also sits. Starting in 2018, four councilmembers are elected from single-member districts and the mayor is elected at-large.

On October 24, 2013, Mayor Mark Lewis resigned his position after coming under criticism for remarks he made about El Cajon's Chaldean community. Many notable figures including Congressman Juan Vargas and Neighborhood Market Association President Mark Arabo called for his resignation. Lewis resigned shortly after due to health issues. On November 12, the city council appointed Councilman Bill Wells, who had been serving as interim mayor, as the mayor. The vote of the council was 4–0; Wells recused himself. He was elected to a full four-year term as mayor in November 2014 and re-elected in November 2018.

The current mayor and city councilmembers include Mayor Bill Wells and City Councilmembers Gary Kendrick, Steve Goble, Phil Ortiz, and Michelle Metchel.  El Cajon's city manager is Graham Mitchell.

State and federal representation

Economy

The Parkway Plaza shopping mall is located in El Cajon.

Top employers
According to the city's 2014 Comprehensive Annual Financial Report, the top employers in the city are:

Schools
Cajon Valley Union School District operates public elementary and middle schools. Grossmont Union High School District operates public high schools.

Public elementary schools

 Anza Elementary
 Avocado Elementary
 Blossom Valley Elementary
 Bostonia Elementary
 Chase Avenue Elementary
 Crest Elementary
 Dehesa School 
 Fletcher Hills Elementary
 Flying Hills Elementary
 Fuerte Elementary
 Jamacha Elementary
 Johnson Elementary
 Lexington Elementary
 Madison Elementary
 Magnolia Elementary
 Meridian Elementary
 Naranca Elementary
 Rancho San Diego Elementary
 Rios Elementary
 Vista Grande Elementary
 W.D. Hall Elementary

Public middle schools
 Cajon Valley Middle School
 Greenfield Middle School
 Hillsdale Middle School
 Los Coches Creek Middle School
 Montgomery Middle School

Public high schools
 Chaparral High School
 Christian High School
 El Cajon Valley High School
 Granite Hills High School
 Grossmont High School
 Grossmont Middle College High School
 IDEA Center High School
 Valhalla High School
Steele Canyon high school

Private schools
 Foothills Christian Schools (Preschool, middle school, and high school campuses)

Colleges
 Advanced Training
 Cuyamaca College
 Grossmont College
 San Diego Christian College
 Seminary of Mar Abba the Great of the Chaldean Catholic Church

Places of interest

Annual events
On a Saturday in May, the city celebrates its diversity with a free family-friendly event called "America on Main Street". The festival replaces a previous city-sponsored event called the International Friendship Festival, which ran from 1991 to 2003. Both festivals highlight the city's identity as a "mini-United Nations", with 30% of its population being immigrants from Iraq, Somalia, Syria, Turkey, and other countries.

El Cajon's annual Mother Goose Parade has been held on the Sunday before Thanksgiving every year since 1946. Organizers claim it is the largest parade in San Diego County. It features more than 100 entries, including "motorized floats, marching bands and drill units, equestrians, clowns, performing artists, giant helium balloons, specialty vehicles, and Santa Claus."

Visitor attractions 
Visitor attractions in and around El Cajon include the Water Conservation Garden and Butterfly Garden at Cuyamaca College, Sycuan Casino, Summers Past Farms, and the Parkway Plaza Mall.

Airports
 Gillespie Field

Notable people

Lester Bangs, Rolling Stone rock critic
William Bengen, certified financial planner who proposed the 4 percent draw-down rule in retirement planning
Kurt Bevacqua, former Major League Baseball player
Aaron Boone, former Major League Baseball player
Bob Boone, former Major League Baseball player
Bret Boone, former Major League Baseball player
Tony Clark, former Major League Baseball player
Kevin Correia, former Major League Baseball player
William John Cox (Billy Jack Cox), public interest attorney, political activist, El Cajon police officer 1962-68
Dave Dravecky, former Major League Baseball player
Amy Finley, host of The Gourmet Next Door on Food Network Channel
Geoff Geary, former Major League Baseball player
Brian Giles, former Major League Baseball player
Marcus Giles, former Major League Baseball player
Broc Glover, professional motocross racer
Brian Graham, former Minor League Baseball player
A.J. Griffin, current Major League Baseball player
Ryan Hansen, actor
Chris Holder, former Minor League Baseball player
Mike Hartley, former Major League Baseball player
David Jeremiah, Christian minister
Jimmie Johnson, seven-time NASCAR champion
Ricky Johnson, motocross racer
Joe Kennedy, former Major League Baseball player
Jean Landis, aviator
David Lee, volleyball Olympic gold medalist
Darrell Long, noted American Computer Scientist and Engineer
Greg Louganis, Olympic diver, 1984 and 1988 gold medalist
Mark Malone, former NFL football player and sportscaster
Glen Morgan, film director
Joe Musgrove, current Major League Baseball player
Swen Nater, former NBA basketball player
Alfred Olango, shooting victim
Grant Roberts, former Major League Baseball player
Brian Sipe, former NFL football player
Shane Spencer, former Major League Baseball player
Tommy Vardell, former NFL football player
Brandon Whitt, former NASCAR driver
Katie Wilkins, Team USA Olympic volleyball player
James Wong, television producer
Frank Zappa, musician
Barry Zito, former Major League Baseball player

See also

References

External links

 
 The East County Californian - newspaper serving El Cajon

 
Cities in San Diego County, California
East County (San Diego County)
Incorporated cities and towns in California
Populated places established in 1875
1875 establishments in California
Populated places established in 1912
1912 establishments in California